Bangladesh first issued its own postage stamps upon gaining independence in 1971. A set of eight stamps, with various motifs including a map of the country, were issued. Shortly after, stamps in eight values were overprinted "Bangladesh Liberated" in both English and Bengali were prepared in the United Kingdom, but only three values were issued in Bangladesh.

Overprints
While the initial stamps were being produced, local postmasters were authorised to overprint the Pakistani stamps that they had in stock with the name of their new country. This practice led to a large number of varieties, not catalogued in the major stamp catalogues. These issues ceased to be valid in 1973.

First stamps
The first stamps of the country were issued in rupees (1 rupee = 100 paisa) on 29 July 1971, but in 1972 a new currency was introduced (1 taka = 100 poisha) and since then all stamps have been inscribed with taka or poisha values.

Issuing policy

Since the first 1971 issue, the Bangladeshi postal authorities have maintained a conservative issuing policy.  Just over 900 individual stamps and miniature sheets were listed in the regular Stanley Gibbons catalogues by 2008, plus approximately 50 issues overprinted "Official" for Governmental use. No stamp booklets have yet been produced.

The majority of themes featured on Bangladeshi stamps have been locally based; these are interspersed with occasional general thematic issues (e.g. fish, birds, etc.) and those for worldwide events (e.g. Olympic Games, football and cricket World Cups, etc.)

See also
Bangladesh National Philatelic Association
Revenue stamps of Bangladesh
Bangladesh Institute of Philatelic Studies

Further reading
 Ishtique Ahmed Khan, The Meter Franking Cancellations of Bangladesh. Dhaka: Bangladesh Institute of Philatelic Studies, 1996.

References and sources
References

Sources
 Stanley Gibbons Ltd: various catalogues
 Encyclopaedia of Postal Authorities

External links
 Bangladesh Post Office
  Siddique Mahmudur Rahman, History of Postal Service and Postage Stamps of Bangladesh, TrulyBangladesh.com (13 October 2009)
 THE FIRST STAMPS OF BANGLADESH
 Online catalogue of Bangladesh stamps.

Postal system of Bangladesh
Bangladesh
History of Bangladesh by topic